Immanuel Hall, previously known as Immanuel Evangelical Church, is a historic Late Gothic Revival church in the Carpenter Gothic style located in Hinsdale, Illinois. It was constructed in 1900 by Lutheran German immigrants for three thousand dollars. Services in the one-story building were conducted in the German language until the 1930s, when the church became affiliated with the Evangelical and Reformed Church and began services in English. The congregation moved to a new building in Burr Ridge, Illinois, in 1964. The former church in Hinsdale was then used as an office for the United Church of Christ. The church grounds were sold in 1982, and the building operated as a Montessori method preschool. In 1999, the building was again sold, and targeted for demolition by the new owners. A deal was brokered between the owners and the Hinsdale Historical Society to preserve the main church building. The remaining building was added to the National Register of Historic Places in early 2001. The building was restored from 2007 to 2008, and is now used for public events.

References
Hinsdale Historical Society: Immanuel Hall: Timeline
National Register of Historic Places: Immanuel Evangelical Church

German-American history
German-American culture in Illinois
National Register of Historic Places in DuPage County, Illinois
Hinsdale, Illinois
Lutheran churches in Illinois
United Church of Christ churches in Illinois
Churches in DuPage County, Illinois
Churches on the National Register of Historic Places in Illinois